Bruno Henrique Pinto (born 30 December 1990), known as Bruno Henrique, is a Brazilian footballer who plays  as a forward for Flamengo and the Brazil national team.

He made his Campeonato Brasileiro Série A debut with Goiás in 2015 and then moved to Germany, where he made just 17 appearances in a year with VfL Wolfsburg before returning home to Santos for  €4 million. In January 2019, he moved to Flamengo for a fee of R$23 million, and won the Campeonato Carioca, Brazilian Serie A and Libertadores Cup in his first year, ending as top scorer in the first and voted The Best of the tournament in the last, being the first in the history of the Libertadores to be rewarded with a 18k gold and diamonds ring.

Bruno Henrique made his senior international debut for Brazil in 2019.

Club career

Early career
Born in Belo Horizonte, Minas Gerais, Bruno Henrique joined Cruzeiro after being named the best player of the 2012 Copa Itatiaia (an amateur competition in the state) while playing for Inconfidência FC. He made his senior debuts while on loan at Uberlândia in 2012, and signed permanently for the club in 2013.

In July 2014 Bruno Henrique was loaned to Itumbiara. He scored seven goals in only 12 matches for the side, including braces against América-GO and Iporá.

Goiás
After scoring seven goals for Itumbiara, Bruno Henrique moved to Goiás on 7 January 2015. He made his debut for the club late in the month by starting in a 2–2 Campeonato Goiano home draw against Trindade, and scored his first goal on 4 February in a 3–1 away win against CRAC.

Bruno Henrique made his Série A debut on 10 May, starting in a 0–0 away draw against Vasco. He scored his first goals in the category six days later, netting his team's all goals in a 2–0 home win against Atlético Paranaense.

Wolfsburg
Bruno Henrique moved abroad for the first time in his career on 29 January 2016, joining Bundesliga club VfL Wolfsburg. He made his debut in the category on 6 February, coming on as a second half substitute for Max Kruse in a 3–0 away loss against FC Schalke 04.

Bruno Henrique made his UEFA Champions League debut on 6 April 2016, starting and assisting Maximilian Arnold's second goal in a 2–0 home win against Real Madrid; he also started in the second leg six days later, a 3–0 loss at the Santiago Bernabéu Stadium which knocked his side out of the competition.

Santos

On 23 January 2017, Bruno Henrique joined Santos back in his home country, after an € 4 million offer was accepted by Wolfsburg. He was officially announced at his new club four days later, signing a four-year contract.

Bruno Henrique made his debut for the club on 12 February 2017, coming on as a second-half substitute in a 3–2 Campeonato Paulista away win against Red Bull Brasil. He scored his first goals on 12 March, netting a hat-trick in a 4–1 away routing of São Bernardo FC.

On 23 July 2017, Bruno Henrique scored all his team's goals in a 3–0 home defeat of Bahia. He finished the season with 18 goals and 11 assists, being best of his team in both attributes.

Bruno Henrique only played for ten minutes during the first match of the 2018 season before suffering an eye injury which kept him out for three months.

Flamengo
On 23 January 2019, Bruno Henrique agreed to a deal with fellow top tier club Flamengo, for a rumoured fee of R$23 million, plus Jean Lucas on loan to Santos for one year.

In the year's Campeonato Carioca, Bruno Henrique finished as top scorer with eight goals, six of them as braces in Clássicos against the state's other heavyweights, Botafogo, Fluminense and Vasco da Gama. The last of these was on 14 April in a 2–0 away win in the first leg of the final, which Fla won 4–0 on aggregate.

On Bruno Henrique's Série A debut for Flamengo on 22 April, he scored twice in a 3–1 home comeback win over his former team Cruzeiro, who had not lost in 2019. By late October in the end stages of the national championship, Bruno Henrique and strike partner Gabriel Barbosa had 60 goals over the year, more than five whole Série A teams. On 3 November, he scored a hat-trick in a 4–1 win over Corinthians at the Maracanã Stadium.

Bruno Henrique scored five goals in the 2019 Copa Libertadores, which his club won for the second time in their history. In the quarter-final against compatriots Internacional, he scored both goals in the first leg and assisted Gabriel Barbosa's equaliser in the second, for the Rubro-Negro to make the last four for the first time in 35 years. In the final on 23 November in Lima, Peru, Flamengo won 2–1 with a late comeback against River Plate. Deep into added time, Bruno Henrique was kicked while on the floor by opponent Exequiel Palacios who was sent off, while Gabriel Barbosa was also dismissed for applauding the decision. He was named Player of the Tournament by CONMEBOL.

At the 2019 FIFA Club World Cup in Qatar, Flamengo finished as runners-up to Liverpool. Bruno Henrique scored in the semi-finals as the team came from behind to win 3–1 against Asian champions Al Hilal of Saudi Arabia.

International career
Coach Tite called up Bruno Henrique to the Brazil squad in August 2019 for friendlies against Colombia and Peru in the United States. He debuted against the former at the Hard Rock Stadium in Miami on 6 September, replacing Philippe Coutinho for the last ten minutes of a 2–2 draw.

Personal life
Bruno Henrique's older brother, Juninho, is also a footballer and a forward. Both played together at Uberlândia in 2013.

Style of play
Described as "a complete player" by former coach Jorge Jesus, Bruno Henrique is most well known for his acceleration and pace, being considered one of the fastest strikers in the world. He is usually deployed as a winger or a striker in the left side of the attack, where he uses his dribbling technique and speed to beat opponents in one-on-one situations.

Since joining Flamengo in 2019, Bruno Henrique has been dubbed "Rei dos Clássicos" ("King of derbies") for often scoring against local rivals Vasco da Gama, Fluminense and Botafogo.

Career statistics

Club

International

Honours

Club
Goiás
Campeonato Goiano: 2015

Flamengo
Copa Libertadores: 2019, 2022
Recopa Sudamericana: 2020
Campeonato Brasileiro Série A: 2019, 2020
Copa do Brasil: 2022
Supercopa do Brasil: 2020, 2021
Campeonato Carioca: 2019, 2020, 2021

Individual
 Copa Libertadores Team of the Tournament: 2019
Campeonato Brasileiro Série A Best Player: 2019
Campeonato Brasileiro Série A Team of the Year: 2019
Campeonato Carioca top scorer: 2019
Copa Libertadores Best player: 2019
Bola de Prata: 2019
FIFA Club World Cup Silver Ball: 2019
Campeonato Carioca Team of the Year: 2019, 2020

References

External links

1990 births
Living people
Footballers from Belo Horizonte
Brazilian footballers
Association football forwards
Campeonato Brasileiro Série A players
Cruzeiro Esporte Clube players
Uberlândia Esporte Clube players
Itumbiara Esporte Clube players
Goiás Esporte Clube players
Santos FC players
CR Flamengo footballers
Bundesliga players
VfL Wolfsburg players
Copa Libertadores-winning players
Expatriate footballers in Germany
Brazilian expatriate footballers
Brazilian expatriate sportspeople in Germany
Brazil international footballers